This is a survey of the postage stamps and postal history of South Africa.

The Republic of South Africa, previously The Union of South Africa, is a country located at the southern tip of Africa, with a coastline on the Atlantic and Indian Oceans. To the north lie Namibia, Botswana and Zimbabwe; to the east are Mozambique and Swaziland; while Lesotho is an independent country wholly surrounded by South African territory.

Pre-Union States

Before South Africa was united in 1910, each part of what would later become South Africa issued their own stamps. These were:
Cape of Good Hope (1853–1904)
Natal (1857–1909)
Orange Free State (1868–1897, annexed to Orange River Colony)
South African Republic (1869–1877 and 1882–1897, annexed to Transvaal)
Griqualand West (1874–1879, annexed to Cape Colony)
Transvaal (1877–1880 and 1900–1909)
Stellaland (1884–1885, annexed to British Bechuanaland)
British Bechuanaland (1885–1895, annexed to Cape Colony)
New Republic (1886–1887, annexed to South African Republic) 
Zululand (1888–1896, annexed to Natal) 
Orange River Colony (1900–1909)

During the Second Boer War, some cities issued their own stamps. These were:
Lydenburg (1900)
Mafeking (1900)
Pietersburg (1901)
Rustenburg (1900)
Schweizer Renecke (1900)
Volksrust (1902)
Vryburg (1899–1900)
Wolmaransstad (1900).

Union of South Africa (1910–1961)

The first stamp of the Union of South Africa was a 2d stamp issued on 4 November 1910. It portrayed the monarch King George V and the arms of the four British colonies which formed the Union: Cape Colony, Natal, Orange River Colony and Transvaal. Most South African stamps issued between 1926 and 1951 were in pairs. One was inscribed 'SOUTH AFRICA' and the other 'SUIDAFRIKA' or 'SUID-AFRIKA'.

Republic of South Africa (1961-)
The first set of the Republic was issued on 31 May 1961. From 1961 to 1966, stamps were inscribed "REPUBLIC OF SOUTH AFRICA REPUBLIEK VAN SUID-AFRIKA". However, from 1967 stamps were simply inscribed "RSA". Modern issues are just inscribed "South Africa".

South African Bantustans

The South African Bantustans of Bophuthatswana (1977–1994), Ciskei (1981–1994), Transkei (1976–1994) and Venda (1979–1994) also issued their own stamps.

The South African Bantustans' stamps are given full listing in Stanley Gibbons' Catalogue of British Commonwealth Stamps.

See also 
Revenue stamps of South Africa
Postage stamps and postal history of Pietersburg

References

Further reading
 Berry, T.B. and S.J. Vermaak. The Interprovincial Stamps and Postmarks of the Union of South Africa. Johannesburg: The Philatelic Federation of Southern Africa, 1965 66p.
 Bishop, Percy C. The Postage Stamps of the Union of South Africa: a collectors' handbook and guide to values. Durban: Philatelic Society of Natal, 1936? 80p. 
 Hagger, S.J. The Stamps of the Union of South Africa, 1910-1961. Cape Town: Published on behalf of the Philatelic Federation of Southern Africa by Reijger Publishers (Pty) Ltd., 1986  253p.
 Heffermann, Lutz. The South African Stamp Colour Catalogue 32nd Edition. Johannesburg: International Philatelic Service, 2013 404p.
 Joseph, B. and J. von Varendorff. NET Catalogue of the Stamps of South Africa & South West Africa. s.l.: B. Joseph, 1974 149p.
 Lobdell, H. E. The De La Rue Georgians of South Africa. New York: The Collectors Club, 1944 100p.
 Page, W. A. The Mobile Post Offices of South Africa: the postmarks, registration marks & cachets, 1937-1983. Dartford: W.A. Page, 1989 51p.
 Putzel, Ralph F. Encyclopaedia of South African Post Offices and Postal Agencies... Cape Town: Hale & Putzel, 1986-1987 Vol. 1.:A-E; Vol. 2: F-M. 
 Quik, W.J. De Postwaardestukken van Zuid-Afrika = The Postal Stationery of South Africa. Part 2. South Afrika 1910-2000. Rotterdam: Filatelistenvereniging Zuidelijk Afrika, 2000
 Reisener, Hasso O. The Special and Commemorative Postmarks, Cachets and Covers of South Africa, 1892-1975. Pretoria: H. Reisener, 1975  341p.
 South African Collectors Society. A Celebration of the Philately of the Union of South Africa: A souvenir booklet to commemorate the centenary of the establishment of the Union of South Africa : 1910-2010. Great Britain: South African Collectors Society, 2010 28p.
 Van der Linde, W. A. The Post Office. Pretoria: Hollandsch Afrikaansche Uitgevers Maatschappij, 1982  47p.
 Vermaak, S.J. A Chronology of the Postal Slogans of South Africa. Florida: SAC, 1979  92p.
 Ward, Gordon. The Ship Penny of South Africa. Sale: C.E. Sherwood, 1959 80p.
 Wyndham, L. A. The Airposts of South Africa. Cape Town: Printed by Cape Times, Ltd., 1936 126p.

External links
Stamp Domain

Postal system of South Africa
South Africa